Xylecata rattrayi is a moth of the family Erebidae first described by Charles Swinhoe in 1904. It is found in Angola, Cameroon, the Democratic Republic of the Congo, Kenya, Tanzania and Uganda.

References

Nyctemerina
Moths described in 1904